is a virtual YouTuber affiliated with Hololive English. She debuted on September 13, 2020, and has since become the most subscribed virtual YouTuber, amassing over 4 million subscribers. Her livestreams focus on entertainment, and primarily consist of Let's Plays, karaoke, and chats with the audience. Gura is often called "Same-chan" in Japan, same meaning shark.

Career
Cover Corporation announced auditions for English speakers from April 23 to May 24 of 2020, following the global success of its Japanese VTuber lineup. The design of Gawr Gura was illustrated by Amashiro Natsuki, and the original modeling was done by Shin Umiushi.

Gura's Twitter activities first began on September 9, 2020. Her first YouTube livestream was broadcast at 6 AM JST on September 13, to a viewership of approximately 45,000 people; the VOD gained over 800,000 views in the span of three days. On November 28, "Gawr Gura" was listed in the Niconico Japanese Internet Pop 100 as one of the top 100 most popular search terms of that year on Niconico and Pixiv, ranking 99th.

Her channel reached 1 million subscribers on October 22, 2020, which was the fastest growth of any VTuber channel. On January 18, her channel subscribers surpassed 2 million, making her the second VTuber to reach this milestone, second only to Kizuna AI, and she celebrated with a karaoke stream on January 23. On May 7, her first outfit reveal stream reached a peak of 194,280 simultaneous viewers, breaking the VTuber record previously held by Sakura Miko (about 145,000). Her first original song, "REFLECT", was released on June 21, 2021. On June 30, 5:01 a.m. (UTC+0), she reached 2.97 million subscribers on July 1, surpassing Kizuna AI as the most subscribed VTuber on YouTube. On July 4, she became the first virtual YouTuber to reach 3 million subscribers, and subsequently 4 million subscribers on June 16, 2022.

On July 3, 2021, it was announced that a Gawr Gura Nendoroid figure would be produced, and on August 6, pre-orders for the figure were opened. On March 18, 2022, following her 3D debut live performance at Makuhari Messe, it was announced that the life-sized figure and 1/7-scale figure of Gura, which were both displayed at the expo, would be auctioned for charity.

On April 25, 2022, Cover Corporation announced the Hololive Meet project, featuring all the talent from across Hololive Production and aims to accelerate the expansion of Hololive Production into international markets and named Gawr Gura, Tokino Sora and Ayunda Risu as ambassadors for the project.  The three appeared at Anime Expo the same year.

On December 2, 2022, Cover Corporation announced a collaboration with musician DECO*27, named "Holo*27" featuring Hololive talents to perform at the Holo*27 stage at the Hololive 4th Fest. Our Bright Parade on March 19, 2023 and named Gura as one of the participating members.

On February 8, 2023, the Tokyo Metropolitan Government appointed Gura, fellow Hololive Myth member Mori Calliope and Hololive Japan member Sakura Miko as Tokyo Tourism Ambassadors with the aim of "increasing the number of visitors and revitalizing the region" for potential visitors. Hololive Production noted that the three will "share the attractions of Tokyo to the world"

Popularity

On September 9, 2020, Gura posted her first tweet with the word "a". On September 13, her first live broadcast was delayed and her first words were "a". Later, the broadcast was interrupted due to equipment problems, leaving tens of thousands of users typing "a" in the chat room, waiting for the broadcast to resume. "a" quickly became an internet meme. This, combined with the overall popular surge of VTubers (and virtual reality in general) as a result of the COVID-19 pandemic, likely contributed to Gura's fast success. Only forty days after her debut, she had reached one million subscribers, becoming the first Hololive VTuber to do so.

Appearances outside YouTube

TV-programs
 Cameo appearance in a Taco Bell commercial that aired on July 23, 2021, as part of a sponsorship for their Nacho Fries product. According to creative director Daniel Chen, Taco Bell is the first American company to feature a VTuber.

Video-games

 Groove Coaster: Wai Wai Party!!!! - Playable character and in-game narrator, added to the game in an update on December 16, 2021

Discography

Singles

References

External links

 

Hololive Production
American YouTubers
Living people
YouTube channels launched in 2020
Year of birth missing (living people)
YouTube streamers
Fictional characters introduced in 2020